Enzyme and Microbial Technology is an international, peer-reviewed journal publishing original research and reviews, of biotechnological significance and novelty, on basic and applied aspects of the science and technology of processes involving the use of enzymes, micro-organisms, animal cells and plant cells.

Abstracting and indexing 
The journal is abstracted and indexed in:

According to the Journal Citation Reports, the journal has a 2021 impact factor of 3.705.

References

External links 
 

Elsevier academic journals
Biotechnology journals
English-language journals
Publications established in 1979
Journals published between 13 and 25 times per year